Lunches for Learning is a non-profit organization founded in 2004 and incorporated in 2005 by Ron Hicks. Lunches for Learning provides a meal to children attending public schools and kindergartens within the Republic of Honduras. Lunches for Learning, Inc. is also listed as an incorporated entity in the republic of Honduras, where it predominantly operates.

Lunches for Learning intends to help impoverished children eat while getting a public education. The primary objective of the program is to permit children to attend school and receive a basic six-grade academic education (adequate in exponentially increasing the chances of a decent future above the poverty level for an individual in Honduras).

Lunches for Learning provides a daily lunch for elementary school children by utilizing the cooperative efforts of individual contributors, corporate sponsors, and the government of Honduras. Currently, the Lunches for Learning program accommodates 29 schools and 1,700 children. In the US, L4L's operations are predominantly staffed by volunteers under the leadership of an executive director.  In Honduras, L4L employs local Honduran citizens who provide essential management and administration of their program in the country.  Both volunteers and employees in Honduras and the US are dedicated individuals, working efficiently to keep administrative and logistical costs low so that more hungry children can be fed.

In addition to its main goal, Lunches for Learning also helps to build kitchens and assists World Food Program (WFP) in transporting legumes, corn, rice, and cooking oil necessary for producing meals.

Board of Directors

Staff

Growth

The Lunches for Learning program started with 84 children in 1 school. Since 2004, the L4L Organization has grown to sponsor 29 schools and accommodate over 1,700 children.

Sponsored schools

The "Schools" section of the Lunches for Learning website provides an interactive GPS map with geographically accurate map-points in which all L4L program-sponsored schools are shown, number of students, along with their current community.

Benito Montoya, El Barrial, Nacaome 
Policarpo Paz Garcia, El Coyolar, Goascoran 
Francisco Morazan, La Peña, Goascoran 
3 De Octubre, Sabana Redonda, Goascoran 
Jose Cecilio Del Valle, Piedras Blancas, Goascoran 
Nueva Honduras, El Junquillo, Goascoran 
Manuel De Jesus Subirana, Santa Lucia, Goascoran 
Jose Trinidad Reyes, El Picacho, Goascoran
Jose Trinidad Cabañas, El Rincon, Goascoran 
Andrea Gonzales, El Amatillo, Goascoran 
Jose Trinidad Cabañas, Los Almendros, Goascoran
Jardin Alegrias Infantiles, El Rincon, Goascoran
Dr. Juan Lindo, La Puya, Goascoran
Jose Cecilio Del Valle, Las Posas, Aramacina
Napoeon Arias Cristales, Es Resbaloso, Goascoran
Dionicio De Herrera, El Junquillo, Nacaome
Dr. Ersy Mejia, Jicaro Abajo, Nacaome
Jose Santos Guardiola, Jicaro, Nacaome
Pedro Nufio, El Rincon, Nacaome
Jose Angel Cerrato, Torrecillas, Nacaome
Jardin El Porvenir, El Rincon, Nacaome
Francisco Marazan, Bañaderos
Ramon Amaya Amador, Estacones
Ana Garcia, Tierras Morenas
Romulo Alvarado, El Caragual
Julio Reyes Diaz, Mapachin
Manuel Bonilla, Las Tablas 
Gustavo Adolfo Andino, Rincon Ocotillo
15 de Septiembre, El Tamarindo

References

External links

Education in Honduras